The 2022 Turkish Super Cup (Turkish: TFF Süper Kupa) or 2022 Turkcell Super Cup for sponsorship reasons, was the 49th edition of the Turkish Super Cup since its establishment as Presidential Cup in 1966, the annual Turkish football match contested by the winners of the previous season's top league and cup competitions (or cup runner-up in case the league- and cup-winning club is the same). The game was played on 30 July 2022 between Trabzonspor and Sivasspor. The venue was the Atatürk Olympic Stadium in Istanbul, Turkey.

Teams

Match

Details

Notes

References

 

2022
Super Cup
Trabzonspor matches
Sivasspor matches
Turkish Super Cup
Sport in Istanbul